Artemis Skevakis Jegart Housewright (born July 18, 1927) is a painter and interior decorator from Florida, named one of the outstanding new talents in the US by Art in America in 1956.

She created a mural of the Capitol Center for Tallahassee's original Municipal Airport which was dedicated April 23, 1961, a mural later re-created and exhibited at Tallahassee International Airport. She was also commissioned to paint a mural in Dodd Hall on FSU's campus. She primarily worked in oils and polymer using a collage style, Later in her life as she worked more on interiors she would often use local materials particularly seashells.

Personal life
Jegart was born in Florida to Paul H Skevakis and  Evelyn D Skevakis. She had one older sibling, Mary Skevakis. She was married to sculptor Rudolf Jegart, and divorced in December 1967. The couple had one daughter, Rudi, born on July 11, 1959.

Jegart earned a Bachelor's and master's degree in art from Florida State University. Jegart married Riley Housewright on August 30, 1969, and moved with him to Frederick, Maryland. The couple were married for 34 years.

References

1927 births
Artists from Florida
American contemporary painters
Living people
20th-century American women artists
Florida State University alumni
21st-century American women